The Good Party (Turkish: İyi Parti) is a nationalist and Kemalist political party in Turkey, established on 25 October 2017 by its current leader Meral Akşener. The party's name and flag is a reference to the emblem of the Kayı tribe.

The party was formed as a result in a split by prominent former members of Turkey's Nationalist Movement Party (MHP) and later joined by some former members of the main opposition Republican People's Party (CHP). The party's founder and chairperson, Meral Akşener, and its deputy chairperson, Koray Aydın, are both former members of the MHP before establishing the party. Plans to form a new party emerged amongst prominent MHP defectors after the MHP's support for a 'Yes' vote in the controversial 2017 constitutional referendum, as well as a failed attempt to unseat the party's governing leader. In addition to endorsing a more moderate civic nationalism as opposed to the ardent ethnic nationalism of the MHP, the party runs on an anti-establishment platform criticising both the governing and opposition parties in Turkey for their ineffectiveness. The party describes itself as being in the centre of political spectrum and advocating for a positive agenda which will bring the European Union and Turkey closer again, and highlights that Turkey must continue being a part of the Western Bloc. Third-party sources have described the party as being centre-right or on the right-wing of the political spectrum.

It puts a particular emphasis on the restoration of the parliamentary system and the integrity of the judiciary and other institutions. The party has been widely described as an anti-Erdoğanist alternative for right-leaning voters disillusioned with both the Nationalist Movement Party (MHP) and the governing Justice and Development Party (AKP).

İYİ participated in the Nation Alliance (Millet İttifakı) with the CHP, Felicity Party, and Democrat Party in the 2018 parliamentary elections winning 43 seats for themselves in the Grand National Assembly. Meral Akşener was the party's presidential candidate.

History

MHP leadership challenge

Meral Akşener, a former Minister of the Interior who served from 1996 to 1997, was a prominent member of parliament from the Nationalist Movement Party (MHP) from 2007 to November 2015, having been a member of the centre-right True Path Party (DYP) during her ministerial career. Her relation with MHP leader Devlet Bahçeli became noticeably strained after Bahçeli refused to nominate her for another term as Deputy Speaker of the Grand National Assembly after the June 2015 general election, a post she had held since 2007. Bahçeli eventually withdrew her parliamentary nomination before the November 2015 snap election, resulting in her losing her parliamentary seat.

The MHP, having won 16.29% of the vote and 80 seats in June 2015, suffered a heavy defeat in the November snap election with just 11.90% of the vote and 40 seats. The loss was widely blamed on Bahçeli's refusal to consider any coalition agreement after the June 2015 election resulted in a hung parliament. The significant loss resulted in MHP dissidents including Akşener launching a drive to unseat Bahçeli from the party's leadership, a process made difficult by the party's strict bylaws.

With several MHP delegates supporting the dissidents' drive for a fresh leadership election, Akşener and the other leadership candidates joined forces to hold a constitutional convention, claiming they had the right to do so due to surpassing the required number of delegate signatures required. The MHP leadership boycotted the congress and declared it illegal, taking the process to court. The courts eventually upheld the claim that enough signatures had been submitted and forced the MHP leadership to hold a congress. In a controversial move, another court and the Supreme Electoral Council of Turkey (YSK) both struck down the ruling and asked the MHP leadership to not hold a congress. The move was widely seen as an interference in the judicial process and inner-party democracy by the governing Justice and Development Party (AKP) and the Ministry of Justice, which both had an interest in keeping the increasingly cooperative Bahçeli as MHP leader and preventing Akşener from mounting a challenge to the government. Akşener and several other dissidents were expelled from the party in the following months, mounting unsuccessful challenges against their suspensions. The constitutional convention held in June 2016 was annulled by the courts in January 2017.

2017 constitutional referendum

In December 2016, the governing AKP and opposition MHP agreed to put forward a joint constitutional amendment proposal that would change Turkey's parliamentary system into an executive presidency. The MHP's support for the proposals came as a surprise given the party's historically staunch opposition to an executive presidency. Many MHP members and prominent dissidents refused to support the party leadership and began their own 'No' campaigns. Polls and dissident politicians predicted that between 70–90% of MHP voters would defect from their party's official position and vote 'No'.

Akşener, Okutan, Halaçoğlu and Özdağ all became prominent 'No' campaigners, with many political commentators seeing the alliance as a signal of a forthcoming new political party united under Akşener's leadership. The referendum was very controversial due to a last-minute change in the ballot counting procedure by the Supreme Electoral Council, causing the dissident nationalists and other 'No' campaigners to allege fraud and not recognise the results. According to official results, the 'No' side lost with 48.6% of the vote to 'Yes's 51.4%, though Akşener alleged that the actual result was a victory for 'No' by a margin of 52–48%.

Party preparations
Following the 2017 Turkish constitutional referendum, it was announced that MHP dissidents would unite under a new party led by Akşener, with the party's official announcement expected in September or October 2017. During its preparation period, the party was touted as a 'nationalist conservative' alternative to the MHP and the AKP, while endorsing the principles of Mustafa Kemal Atatürk. The party was also described to be strictly centrist. During the establishment preparations, the names of 'Centrist Democrat Party' (Merkez Demokrat Parti) and 'Mainland Party' (Anayurt Partisi) were alleged to have been selected.

Formation

The party was announced at a congress at the Nâzım Hikmet Cultural Centre in Ankara on 25 October 2017. On that day, the party's name, logo and slogan were revealed to the public. Meral Akşener was formally elected as the party's first leader—unopposed, carrying all votes.

Legal disputes and challenges

The party's name, logo and slogan were immediately subject to legal challenges and controversy, with allegations that they bore resemblance to AKP Antalya Mayor Menderes Türel's 2014 local election campaign. Türel issued a statement claiming that he owned the patents as of 24 October 2015. The AKP Mayor of Bilecik, Selim Yağcı, threatened legal action alleging that the logo was stolen from the official seal of Bilecik Province. The Kayı tribe Association also announced legal challenges, claiming that they had the patent to the flag since 2014. A former AKP mayoral candidate alleged that the party's slogan belonged to him and threatened legal challenges if the party refused to stop using it.

2018 elections

The party quickly gained five members of parliament in the Grand National Assembly who were originally elected for other parties, and numerous provincial and municipal council members that also defected from their former parties. On 22 April 2018, in the run-up to general elections, a further 15 MPs from the CHP moved to the İYİ Party following a joint agreement between the two parties. This was to allow the İYİ Party to form a parliamentary group that would be eligible to field a presidential candidate without the need to collect signatures and compete independently.

Meral Akşener was be the party's 2018 presidential candidate, but didn't stand for election as an MP. Some opinion polls have predicted her personal support at up to 40%, and her party's support for parliamentary elections between 5% and 20%. İYİ participated in the Nation Alliance (Millet İtifakı) with the CHP, SP, and DP in the parliamentary election, receiving 9.96% of the vote.

2019 Municipal election 

Akşener continued the alliance with Kılıçdaroğlu's CHP, dividing the country into regions where only CHP and İYİ candidates would run without interfering with each other. Ekrem İmamoğlu and Mansur Yavaş won as joint Nation Alliance candidates for the Istanbul and Ankara municipalities respectively, however İYİ failed to capture any provincial or metropolitan mayorships for themselves.

2023 elections 
On 3 March 2023, Meral Akşener announced that she took the decision to withdraw from the Table of Six, which was formed in 2022, and the Nation Alliance, and said her party would not support main opposition CHP leader Kemal Kılıçdaroğlu as the joint candidate in the 2023 Turkish presidential election. However on 6 March, Akşener and the Good Party rejoined the Table of Six after intense public criticism and after it was announced that Ekrem İmamoğlu and Mansur Yavaş would be appointed Vice-Presidents if Kılıçdaroğlu wins the presidential election.

Ideology and policies

Meral Akşener describes İYİ Party as a nationalist, developmentalist and democratic party that is on the centre of the political spectrum. The media describes İYİ Party as a Turkish nationalist, conservative and Atatürkist political party on the centre-right or right-wing. Statements made by prominent party members have also espoused a fresh perspective on Turkish politics, criticising the established political parties for incompetence, ineffectiveness and polarising the electorate.

Although the party described itself as nationalist conservative during its formation period, its ideology represents civic nationalism rather than the MHP's ardent ethnic nationalism. The party espouses harmony between ethnic minorities and tolerance for different religions and backgrounds, rejecting any discrimination on ethnic, gender or religious grounds. It is strongly in favour of the ideals and principles of Turkey's founding president, Mustafa Kemal Atatürk.

The party's centrist and Kemalist stance has attracted support from some traditionally centre-left Republican People's Party voters. Aytun Çıray, one of the founders of the party and an MP, is also a former CHP member. The party has also attracted some support from the left-leaning Democratic Left Party (DSP), reinforcing itself as a party for all voters regardless of left-right affiliation. İYİ Party chairperson Akşener read a poem of socialist poet Nazım Hikmet Ran on the anniversary of his death.

Women's rights 
The party, fielding the first woman candidate for Turkish presidency in history, puts great emphasis on women's rights in Turkey and made this a central part of its election campaign. It highlights the statistics and draws attention to the drastic increase of cases of violence against women and rape in Turkey under AKP administration. Akşener declared her pledge to lift good conduct time in all cases of violence against women and rape, and instead of forcefully sending women to therapy in such cases, her party will be sending the perpetrator to mandatory therapy before or after serving their sentence and therapy for women will be optional.

Akşener also reminded the rejected government bill in November 2016 which attempted to make it possible for 12-year-old girls to marry and religious marriages to be considered fully legal, and told that she found this "disgusting" and "saw this as a by-product of the male-dominant structure of politics" and declared that she will make sure that no such bill will even be considered under her administration. She highlighted that, in the last decade, women have become afraid to go alone on the street and wear what they want. She has pledged that under her administration it would be her moral duty to make all women comfortable with their lifestyle and that she would tackle violence and abuse against women and children in a way that no perpetrator will even be able to think of it. Akşener announced that her movement starts a Tülbent Revolution - named after a traditional piece of clothing which rural Turkish women wear to cover their heads partially, but that is non-religious nor associated with political Islam. She has stated that "if men can not unite and keep fighting, a woman rises up, takes the tülbent off her head and throws it on the ground and the nation reconciles". She explained that "youth in Turkey do not see the differences of the past, (...) girls having tattoos and girls wearing the headscarf, and boys having piercings, they do not see each other differently". She went on to state that the Tülbent Revolution will be a symbol for reconciliation of different lifestyles in Turkey, and that, in her eyes, respect is more important than tolerance because tolerance usually describes a majority's behavior upon a minority and that is not the case in Turkish society.

Akşener, contrary to the political party establishment in Turkey, refused to set up a "Women's Wing" for her party advocating that this discriminates against women in essence and instead introduced a mandatory quota of 25% women participance for all branches and candidates of her party, including the general administrative board. She further stated that she actually wanted the quota to be at 30% but the mutual decision was 25% to begin with.

Although there was an increase in participation of women in the workforce in the last decades in Turkey, Akşener states she still finds this inadequate and will implement benevolent sexism to increase participation of women in workforce and to reduce the wage gap.

Described as the Iron Lady of Turkey, during an interview with The Guardian Akşener said: "Now it is time for them, the men in power, to feel fear".

Animal rights 
Currently the law protecting the animal rights in Turkey is vague and not comprehensive and only allows limited monetary compensations for pet owners in cases of harm against their "property". This allowed many cases of intense violence against animals, mostly done by perpetrators just for entertainment, creating public outrage and calls for animal rights laws to be made comprehensive and deterrent punishments to be introduced. Akşener, historically being an animal rights volunteer through her career, has been regarded as the most outspoken candidate for protection of animal rights and against the drastic increase of violation of these rights in Turkey. Upon calls by the Confederation of Animal Rights Associations of Turkey, entitled "No votes for candidates ignoring animal rights", Akşener was first to gather with 250 NGO representatives working on the field and was the first candidate to sign the covenant of animal rights issued by the confederation of NGOs, followed only by HDP candidate Selahattin Demirtaş 2 weeks later.

In February, while in western coastal city of İzmir for a political rally, Akşener personally adopted a cat named Cedric, which was raped earlier and was found covered in blood on a street in Foça and repeated her calls and pledge for comprehensive and deterrent animal rights laws in Turkey.

İYİ Party's program also reserves a whole section for animal rights and mentions pledges including "making animal rights a public demand through intense awareness and consciousness efforts", "full adoption of UNESCO Animal Rights Declaration", "active and effective wildlife protection", "scientific research and tracking of endangered species in Turkey", "strict regulation and bans when necessary on hunting, animal farms, animal racing, animal shows, pet shops, animal shelters and all commercial activities focusing on animals".

EU and European integration 
At a time of increased political tensions between EU and Turkey due to Erdoğan's Anti-EU populist rhetoric, Akşener and her party promoting pro-Europeanism, has become one of the movements which is most openly in favor of the continuation of European integration of Turkey and positive close relations between EU and Turkey, at the same time managing to appeal to conservative and nationalist right-wing voters.

During her MHP days as Deputy Speaker of the Grand National Assembly, even back in 2010, Akşener held a pro-EU stance and was many times part of meetings with EU officials representing Turkey, and was described as the head of the European-leaning wing inside the nationalist party, MHP.

In addition to committed pledges of mainstream social democrat main-opposition CHP and left-wing minority rights HDP, Akşener's İYİ also declares her party's main goal as full membership to the EU and rejects former suggestions made such as "privileged partnership", stating this puts Turkey into a secondary position. However, contrary to other pro-EU parties, the party also does not refrain from criticizing the certain attitudes implemented by EU in the past process in its party program, stating that "Positive EU-Turkey relations are vital for EU as vital as they are to Turkey, but de facto freeze of the full membership process and negotiations is not only because of Turkey's inability to satisfy all the membership requirements but also because of EU's policy towards Turkey being shaped through interior fears in line with rising racist sentiment across EU in the last years." Party program then advocates for the continuation of Turkish integration into EU and goal of full membership but also states the formula for positive relations and integration, with remarks such as "with its current state, EU-Turkey relations do not benefit any side when in fact it can, and such positive and healthy relations between two entities will not only benefit both sides but also the Balkans, Caucasia, Middle East and the Eastern Mediterranean. Thus, the crucial EU-Turkey relations will be freed from the influence of racist sentiment in EU and dysfunctioning full membership process in Turkey and the negotiations process will be revitalized and EU-Turkey relations will positively be redefined", bearing the goal of full membership and open support for positive relations and participation in integration, whether with or without full membership.

On 15 December, Akşener met with the ambassadors of the EU countries led by Christian Berger, head of EU Delegation in Turkey at party headquarters. She rejected to read from a script and talked directly about her opinions, declaring her party's position as full membership to the EU and continuation of the dialogue through membership negotiations and supplementary mechanisms. She stated that "she is against any mindset which scraps Turkey off from Europe and EU".

On an interview with Euronews on February 26, Akşener criticized Erdogan's recent anti-European rhetoric stating that "EU has always been a measure of success in Turkey and the ruling party also, although conflicting with their mindset, due to the political reality of the time, took big steps towards EU from 2002 to 2007. Only after this date, for the first time ever, EU has been started to be depicted as a monster and an enemy in Turkey. We do not agree with that and we see the European project as the first time after the French Revolution in Europe where logic and rationality rules above all the other ideas". She also stated that "with great sadness I also see that recently the same irrational rhetoric used by Erdogan is being picked up by some leaders of the EU", then advising about the need to free both sides from such rhetoric and the necessity to set a positive ground drawing two entities closer together, in line with Atatürk′s peace in the homeland, peace in the world principle and the 160-year-old European character of Turkish foreign policy.

On 8 May, one day before the Europe Day, Meral Akşener met with the German Minister of State for Europe Michael Roth at party headquarters and focused on upcoming elections and German-Turkish partnership and EU-Turkey relations. During the press briefing Akşener made strong remarks which had a broad repercussion in national and European press, saying "Turkey is Europe. It is also beneficial for EU to gain this mindset. In line with that, states must have such positive perspectives to solve their issues."

One day later, this position and party's pro-European stance was further strengthened when Meral Akşener and the party were the only political figures openly celebrating the Europe Day and delivering positive messages in Turkey on May 9. Akşener re-affirmed her message that "states must have positive perspectives to solve such issues to make the region a better place" referring to EU-Turkey relations revitalizing and congratulated everyone's Europe Day on her official Twitter account.

Meanwhile, İYİ Party released a public press statement celebrating the Europe Day and making strong remarks, further bolstering party position with regards to EU affairs. The statement included remarks such as "We see European Union as a project of democracy, rule of law, personal rights and freedoms, peace and prosperity. Today, protecting and implementing these European values are more important than ever. Sustainability of the assertivity of the EU depends on its ability to prevent the interior threatening factions and movements and to keep its vision wide. Full membership to a European Union which sincerely protects its founding values, conforms to pacta sunt servanda and which looks to its European future with trust, undoubtedly, is a desired goal for Turkey, which is a natural member of Europe and an EU Candidate since 1999. İYİ Party's biggest goal is to re-implement democracy, rule of law and personal rights and freedoms according to highest norms. In line with this, under İYİ Party administration, suitable with Turkey's historical inclination and European character, full membership of Turkey to the EU, will contribute vastly to the creation of a Europe which is strong, reliable, dynamic and prosper." The declaration concluded with Akşener's previous remarks "We can live in a better region and world if states approach to solving issues with positive perspectives. We congratulate the Europe Day of all our citizens and our European friends and allies"

Other political heavyweights of the party also reaffirmed party's Pro-European position and full membership goals including İYİ Party MP representing İzmir and party speaker Aytun Çıray, making a press briefing at parliament on January 9, stating "As stated by President Macron, under state of emergency and rule by decree conditions, continuing negotiations and membership dialogue between EU and Turkey is not possible. We also do not accept partnership model suggestions which put Turkey into a secondary position such as "privileged partnership". İYİ Party will put an end to state of emergency, re-instate democracy and rule of law in Turkey and will be the movement which gives Turkey what it deserves, full membership to the European Union." Party vice chairman and MP representing Gaziantep, Ümit Özdağ, voiced his notion that Turkey should stay as an integral part of Western Bloc and "as a student who studied in Europe and having a big respect for their culture and values", advocated for positive and closer relations with EU in August 2017, before the formation of the party. After the formation, on an interview with Cumhuriyet, he explained that EU and Turkey must reshape their relations and put it on a positive path, highlighting that both entities are very much in need of each other, positive relations and cooperation, Refugee crisis, being the latest example.

NATO 
İYİ Party holds a strict position highlighting that it is crucial for Turkey to continue being part of the Western Bloc, thus NATO and is of best national interest. Party program openly states that following the Second World War and Cold War, integration of Turkey into Western Bloc has been very beneficial and functional defence policies and country's national interests still lie on equal cooperation with the rest of the bloc.

Vice chairman Ümit Özdağ also does not refrain from criticizing certain moves by other NATO members too and highlights that due to wrong policies implemented by Erdoğan, NATO allies of Turkey started to incline taking steps sometimes that threaten the national security of Turkey. With regards to that, Özdağ states that their administration will not pursue such wrong policies, but will stay as a cooperative member while protecting the Turkish national security at all times as a member, which AKP fails to do so.

Akşener also heavily criticized the move by Erdoğan administration to buy S-400 missile systems from Russia in a move to distance the country from NATO and the West and get closer to Russia, stating that the move lacks common sense and wisdom and invited Erdoğan for calmness and to have "information on history". Akşener explained that the move makes no sense as the missiles are not compatible with the whole, decades-long existing structure of the Turkish military and defence, which also is integrated to common NATO defence systems, saying that in case of conclusion of such a purchase and its delivery, the S400 missiles will just rot in hangars. She went on to say that such moves by the ruling AKP seriously dishonored and degraded Turkey's foreign policy, conflicting with 150-years old Turkish foreign policy principals and making it worthless and under her administration, İYİ Party will put an end to this trend.

Party spokesperson and MP Aytun Çıray also criticized the move stating that the country which AKP moves to buy missile systems from fully supports organizations aiming to harm and destabilize Turkey and such moves by the ruling party are implemented through their "ideological obsessions" and "learned ignorance", put Turkey towards a dead-end. He went on to make a strong remark, criticizing the recent pro-Russian moves of Erdoğan which shift Turkey away from the Western Bloc and closer to Russia, stating that "never ever since the administration of Mahmud Nedim Pasha...", 19th century grand vizier of the Ottoman Empire, who was highly under influence of Russian officials and was subserviant to Imperial Russia, earning him the nickname Nedimoff, "...Turkey and its foreign policy has been held hostage like this".

Death penalty 
The chairperson of the party Akşener is in favour of reinstating the death penalty in Turkey. On 23 April 2020, she stated in an interview that "there should be a death penalty for terrorism crimes and violence against women".

Armenian genocide
After the United States Congress voted to recognize the Armenian Genocide in 2019, party spokesperson  said, "We will retaliate against it with our decision to name our children Enver, Cemal and Talat"—referring to the Three Pashas who were the main perpetrators of the genocide.

LGBT rights
Good Party Juristical Policies Director Bahadır Erdem stated, "LGBT rights are human rights, therefore human rights activists and jurists defend the rights of these people as well. Whatever rights others have as human beings, they have the same rights." after some members of his family were said to be supporting LGBT rights.

Political program

As described in its official party program, the primary goals set by İYİ Party are to:
 Make Turkey one of the top 10 economies of the world
 Raise the average national income to US$14,500 within five years
 Achieve an average education age of 11 years
 Achieve a 100% literacy rate for women under 40 within five years
 Be among the top 40 countries in the Legatum Prosperity Index within five years
 Have 50 million foreign tourists spending an average of US$1,000 visit Turkey every year
 Return to the parliamentary system with a new constitution within the first year
 Create a democratic political parties law within the first year
 Achieve 150,000 hectares of plantation and erosion control per year
 Be among the top 20 countries in the global PISA education ranking
 Lower the unemployment rate to 8% within five years
 Achieve the Fourth Industrial Revolution and implement Industry 4.0
 Spread the positive energy of women and youth throughout society
 Immediately implement European Union standards in press freedom
 Make Turkish passports valuable and reputable

Specific key policies include supporting a welfare state and an effective counter-terrorism strategy against members of the Gülen Movement (FETÖ) that have been alleged to be behind the failed coup attempt in July 2016. The party identifies FETÖ as the "most serious internal threat" to national security. Another key policy is a reversal of the changes adopted in the controversial 2017 constitutional referendum, which would revert Turkey to a parliamentary republic as opposed to an executive presidency.

The party also vowed to lift the 2017 block of Wikipedia in Turkey on the first day after the elections.

Election results

Presidential elections

Local elections

Leadership

Board
 Chairperson: Meral Akşener
 Director of Political Affairs (Deputy Chairperson): Koray Aydın
 General Secretary: Uğur Poyraz
 Spokesperson: Kürşad Zorlu
 Treasurer: Ümit Dikbayır
 Director of Institutional Relations: Cihan Paçacı
 Director of Juristical and Justice Policies: Bahadır Erdem
 Director of Election Affairs: Şenol Sunat
 Director of International Policies: Ahmet Kamil Erozan
 Director of the Turkic World and Turks Abroad: Rıdvan Uz
 Director of Middle East Policies: Mehmet Salim Ensarioğlu
 Director of Local Administrations: Metin Ergun
 Director of Economic Policies: Bilge Yılmaz
 Director of Development Policies: Ümit Özlale
 Director of National Security Policies: Mehmet Tolga Akalın
 Director of Women Policies: Ünzile Yüksel
 Director of Public and NGO Relations: Burak Akburak
 Director of Education Policies: Sevinç Atabay
 Director of Social Policies: Ayfer Yılmaz

Source:

Parliamentary Group Leaders 

 Group President: İsmail Tatlıoğlu
 Deputy Presidents: Müsavat Dervişoğlu and Erhan Usta

Source:

See also
:Category:Good Party politicians

References

External links
 

 
2017 establishments in Turkey
Right-wing parties
Conservative parties in Turkey
National conservative parties
Nationalist parties in Turkey
Political parties established in 2017
Political parties in Turkey
Secularism in Turkey
Pro-European political parties in Turkey